The Viña del Mar International Song Festival is a music festival that is considered the best and biggest in Latin America and the most important musical event in the Americas which is held annually on the 3rd week of February since 1960 in Viña del Mar, Chile.

Performing artists per year

1960

1961

1962

1963

1964

1965

1966

1967

1968

1969

1970

1971

1972

1973

1974

1975

1976

1977

1978

1979

1980

1981

1982

1983

1984

1985

1986

1987

1988

1989

1990

1991

1992

1993

1994

1995

1996

1997

1998

1999

2000

2001

2002

2003

2004

2005

2006

2007

2008 

Vanilla Ninja from Estonia - won prize of best artist in 2008

2009

2010

2011

2012

2013

2014

2015

2016

2017

2018

2019

2020

2023

Performers per country

Germany 
 Lou Bega (2000)
 Modern Talking (1988)
 Thomas Anders (1989)

Argentina 

 Alberto Cortez (1979)
 Alejandro Lerner (1993)
 Amanda Miguel (1985)
 Antonio Ríos (2001)
 Axel (2007)
 Babasónicos (2005)
 Baby Bell (1961)
 Bárbara y Dick (1969)
 Carlos García (2006)
 Charly García (2003)
 Comanche (1998)
 Coti (2008)
 Diego Torres (1996, 2003, 2005, 2012)
 Diego Verdaguer (1985)
 El Chúcaro (1962)
 Eber Lobato (1976)
 El Símbolo (1999)
 Fito Páez (2002, 2004, 2007, 2014)
 Garras de Amor (2012)
 Gino Renni (1973)
 G.I.T. (1987)
 Gustavo Cerati (2007)
 Héctor Gagliardi (1965)
 Hugo Varela (humor) (1989, 2005)
 Jairo (1983)
 Jorge Alís (2014, 2019)
 Juan Ramón (1990)
 Katunga (1978)
 King África (1995)
 La Mosca Tsé-Tsé (2001)
 Lali (2017)
 Leonardo Favio (1969, 1981, 1997)
 Los Alfiles Negros (1976)
 Los Auténticos Decadentes (2002, 2005, 2013, 2017)
 Los Calzones Rotos (1996)
 Los Charros (1999)
 Los Enanitos Verdes (1988)
 Los Fabulosos Cadillacs (2010, 2017)
 Los Nocheros (2003)
 Los Pericos (1995, 1997)
 Luis Pescetti (humor) (1993)
 Luis Sandrini (1960)
 Marcelo Barticciotto (1999)
 María Marta Serra Lima (1985)
 Marie Claire D'Ubaldo (1995)
 Mercedes Sosa (1993)
 Miguel Mateos (1991)
 Miranda! (2006, 2010)
 Nahuel (1964)
 Noel Schajris (2011)
 Pablo Ruiz (1989)
 Palito Ortega (1977, 1984)
 Pedro Aznar (2003)
 Pepe Gallinato (1972, 1974)
 Piero (1970, 1972, 2002)
 Pimpinela (1984, 2020)
 Ráfaga (2000, 2001, 2012)
 Raúl di Blasio (1985)
 Raúl Labié (1970)
 Ricardo Ceratto (1978)
 Sandra Mihanovich (1986)
 Sandro (1968, 1975)
 Santa Barbara Superstar (1976)
 Silvana Di Lorenzo (1983)
 Sin Bandera (2006)
 Sissi Lobato (1976)
 Soda Stereo (1987)
 Soledad (2000, 2002)
 The Sacados (1992)
 Tormenta (1972)
 Vicentico (2008)
 Víctor Heredia (1972, 2002)
 Zeta Bosio (2014)

Australia 
 Air Supply (1987)
 Bond (2001)
 INXS (2003)

Austria 
 Opus (1986)

Belgium 
 2 Unlimited (1996)
 Martyn Chabry (2006)
 Salvatore Adamo (1982, 2004, 2012)

Bolivia 
 Sandy (1993, 1999, 2000, 2004)

Brazil 
 Alexandre Pires (2005, 2020)
 Angélica (1991)
 As Meninas (2002)
 Axé Bahia (2002)
 Café com Leite (2003)
 Elba Ramalho (1988)
 Fabio Junior (1987)
 Gera Samba (1997)
 Joe Vasconcellos (2000, 2003, 2006)
 José Vasconcelos (1980)
 Leandro e Leonardo (1997)
 Maria Creuza (1978)
 Os Pagãos (1967)
 Porto Bahia (2003)
 Rita Lee (1985)
 Roberto Carlos (1975, 1989, 2011)
 Sandy & Junior (2003)
 Só Pra Contrariar (1999)
 Tavares (1979, 1987)
 Trio Irakitan (1968)
 Xuxa (1990, 2000)

Canada 
 Bam Percussions (varieté) (2003)
 Bryan Adams (2007)
 Heart (1994)
 Nelly Furtado (2008)
 Paul Anka (2010)

Czechoslovakia 
(Nowadays Czech Republic and Slovakia)
 Las Satánicas (1971)

Chile 

 31 minutos (2013)
 Alberto Plaza (1986, 1988, 1990, 1994, 1999, 2005)
 Aleste (1995)
 Alison Mandel (humor) (2018)
 Álvaro Salas (humor) (2000, 2007)
 Álvaro Scaramelli (1988)
 Amango (2008)
 Américo (2010, 2011, 2016)
 Andrea Labarca - (1986 Medley, 1989)
 Andrea Tessa (1983, 2001)
 Antonio Prieto (1962, 1974, 1980, 2002)
 Antonio Zabaleta (1980)
 Armando Palacios (1960)
 Ariztía (1998)
 Arturo Ruiz-Tagle (humor) (2002)
 Augusto Schuster (2018)
 Bafochi (1992, 2007, 2008, 2009, 2010)
 Bafona (1985, 1986, 1987, 1990, 2006)
 Ballet de TVN (1992, 1993)
 Bastián Paz (humor) (2013)
 Beatlemanía (1993)
 Beto Cuevas (2010)
 Bigote Arrocet (1971, 1972, 1974, 1976, 1978)
 Bombo Fica (humor) (2010, 2012, 2018)
 Bric a Brac (1968, 1969)
 Buddy Richard (1982, 1984, 1995, 2002, 2008)
 Café con Leche (2003)
CAMI (2019)
 Canal Magdalena (2004)
 Carlos Heló (1960, 1962, 1963, 1964, 1965, 1970, 1979)
 Catalina Telias (1990)
 Cecilia Echeñique (1993, 2002)
 Chancho en Piedra (2004, 2006)
 Checho Hirane (1984)
 Chocolate (1963)
 Cinema (1987)
 Coco Legrand (1972, 1975, 1977, 1980, 2000, 2006, 2010)
 Congreso (1991, 1993, 2005)
 Conjunto Malibú (1975, 1976, 1979)
 Cristóbal (1982)
 Cuncumén (1971)
 Daniel Muñoz (2000, 2001, 2012)
 Daniela "Chiqui" Aguayo (humor) (2017)
Denise Rosenthal (2020)
 Dinamita Show (humor) (1996, 2001, 2009, 2012)
 Dino Gordillo (humor) (1996, 1997, 1998, 2000, 2011, 2019)
 Dino Traverso (1970)
 DJ Méndez (2002, 2004)
 Douglas (2000, 2001, 2004)
 El Huaso Clavel (humor) (1988)
 Edo Caroe (humor) (2016)
 Eduardo Gatti (1991)
 El Pampero (humor) (1995)
 Enrique del Valle - Medley (1986)
 Enzo Corsi (humor) (1992)
Ernesto Belloni (2020)
 Ernesto Ruiz "El Tufo" (1987)
 Estudiantina de la Chimba (1993)
 Fabrizio Copano (humor) (2017)
  (Humor) (2005)
 Fernando Ubiergo (1982, 1985, 1993, 2001, 2009)
 Ferran Alabert (1966, 1967)
 Firulete (1960, 1961, 1965, 1966, 1968, 1971, 1979)
 Florcita Motuda (1983, 1992)
 Francisca Valenzuela (2013, 2020)
 Frecuencia Mod (1978, 1979)
 Generación 2000, del programa Venga conmigo (baile) (2001)
 Gepe (2014)
 Germán Casas (1992, 2002)
 Gigi Martin (2014)
 Ginette Acevedo (1980, 1984)
 Giolito y su Combo (2008)
 Gloria Benavides (1963, 1965, 1968, 1977, 1984, 1988, 1995, 1998, 2002)
 Gloria Simonetti (1974, 1981, 1984)
 Glup (1999, 2000)
 Gondwana (1999, 2001, 2003)
 Hermanos Zabaleta (1993, 2001 La Nueva Ola)
 Hermógenes Conache (1984, 1991, 2013)
 Horacio Saavedra y su orquesta (2010)
 Huganzas (1986)
 Illapu (1973, 1994, 1996, 2002, 2006, 2018)
 Inti-Illimani (2004)
 Irene Llano (1987)
Jani Dueñas (2019)
 Jappening con Já (1981, 1995)
Javiera Contador (2020)
 Javiera Mena (2016)
 Javiera Parra (2003)
 Javiera y Los Imposibles (2002)
 Jenny Cavallo (humor) (2018)
 Joe Vasconcellos (2000, 2003, 2006)
 Jorge Cruz (1987)
 Jorge Franco "El Náufrago" (humor) (1996)
 Jorge González (2013)
 Jorge "Chino" Navarrete (humor) (1994)
 Jorge Pérez (Humor) (1997)
 José Alfredo Fuentes (1981, 2000)
 Juan Antonio Labra (1988, 1989, 1990, 1992)
 Juan Luis Calderón (humor) (2017)
 Juan Pablo López (humor) (2017)
 Juana Fé (2008)
 Keko Yunge (1995, 1999)
 Klaudio Showman (humor) (1989)
 Kudai (2007)
 La Ley (1993, 1994, 1995, 2001, 2002, 2005, 2014)
 La Noche (2009, 2010)
 La Sociedad (1997)
 La Sonora de Tommy Rey (2004, 2006)
 Las Cuatro Brujas (1965)
 Leon Murillo (2015)
 Leonardo Farkas (2009)
 Lorenzo Valderrama (1961, 1963, 1964)
 Los Acetatos (1974)
 Los Atletas de la Risa (2013)
 Los Blops (1971)
 Los Blue Splendor (1964)
 Los Bunkers (2007, 2012)
 Los Diablos Azules (1968)
 Los Cantores de Rucamanqui (1964)
 Los Caporales (1961, 1966, 1975)
 Los Hermanos Bustos (2005)
 Los Hermanos Campos (1965)
 Los Hermanos Silva (1962)
 Los Huasos Quincheros (1960, 1966, 1970, 1973)
 Los Indolatinos (humor) (1996, 1999, 2004)
 Los Jaivas (1983, 2002, 2010, 2011)
 Los Jockers (1967, 1994)
 Los Locos del Humor (2014, 2016)
 Los Muleros (1976, 1977)
 Los Perlas (1960, 1963, 1973, 1974, 1976)
 Los Pitusos (1993)
 Los Prisioneros (1991, 2003)
 Los Ramblers (1962, 1993)
 Los Tigres (1965)
 Los Tres (1996, 2007, 2014)
 Lucho Gatica (1992, 2002)
 Lucho Navarro (1961, 1969, 1981, 1992)
 Lucybell (1998, 2003, 2005, 2007)
 Luis Dimas (1977, 1996, 2001 La Nueva Ola)
 Luis Jara (1987, 1989, 1994, 2000, 2003, 2007, 2016)
 Luz Eliana - La Nueva Ola (2001)
 Maggie (1964)
 Magic Twins (2010)
 Maitén Montenegro (1972, 1974, 1975, 1985)
 Mandolino (1985)
 Manolo González (1960, 1964, 1965, 1978)
 Manuel García (2012)
 Manpoval (2009)
 Marcelo (1984)
 Marciano (2004)
 Marcos "Charola" Pizarro (humor) (1991)
 María Inés Naveillán (1984)
 María José Quintanilla (2004)
 Mario Guerrero (2007)
 Melame (humor) (2003, 2011)
 Melón y Melame (Humor) (1998, 1999)
 Memo Bunke (humor) (2000, 2001, 2003, 2013)
 Miguel Piñera (1983)
 Miguelo (1986)
 Millenium Show (humor) (2001)
 Mon Laferte (2017, 2020)
 Monna Bell (1965)
 Monteaguilino (1989)
 Música Libre (1974)
 Myriam Hernández (1989, 1991, 1994, 2001, 2002, 2003)
 Nadie (1988)
 Nancho Parra (humor) (2013)
 Natalia Cuevas (humor) (2001, 2003, 2004)
 Natalia Valdebenito (humor) (2016)
 Natalino (2009)
 Nicole (1996)
 Orquesta Huambaly (1961)
 Óscar Andrade (1982)
 Óscar Gangas (1998, 2011)
 Osvaldo Dayz (1976, 1991)
 Pablo Bravo - Medley (1986)
 Pablo Herrera (1994, 2000, 2001)
 Pachuco y la Cubanacán (1986, 1987, 1989)
 Palmenia Pizarro (2001)
 Palta Meléndez (humor) (1991, 1994, 1997, 2004, 2007)
 Pancho del Sur (humor) (1997)
 Pancho Puelma (1988)
 Paolo Salvatore (1970)
 Pat Henry (1965, 1968, 1990)
 Patricia Frías (1989)
 Patricia Sanders (1968)
 Patricio Morán (1968)
 Paulo Iglesias (humor) (1991, 1992, 1995, 1996, 2005)
 Payahop (2014)
 Pedro Messone (1967)
 Pedro Ruminot (humor) (2016)
 Pepe Tapia (1986)
 Peter Rock (1990, 2001 La Nueva Ola)
 Pettinellis (2004)
 Piña colada (humor) (1993)
 Platón humor (humor) (1992)
 Profesor Salomón y Tutu-Tutu (2008)
 Pucará (1973)
 Pujillay (1982, 1985, 1990)
 Quilapayún (1973)
 Q.E.P. (1986)
 Rachel (2001)
 Ricardo Meruane (2011, 2016)
 Rodolfo Navech (1986 Medley, 1989)
 Rodrigo González (humor) (2016)
 Rodrigo Villegas (humor) (2017)
 Ronco Retes (1978, 1984)
 Rudy Hernández (1971)
 Rudy Rey (2014)
 Ruperto (2006)
 Sebastián (1984)
 Sergio Feito (1973, 1990)
 Sergio Freire (humor) (2018)
 Sexual Democracia (1992)
 Sinergia (2008)
 Six Pack (Karkú) (2008)
 Soledad Guerrero - Medley (1986)
 Sonora Barón (2008)
 Sonora Palacios (1989, 2005, 2006, 2014)
 Stefan Kramer (humor) (2008, 2018, 2020)
 Tato Cifuentes (1973, 1974)
 The Strangers (1963)
 Tito Fernández (1992, 2001, 2002, 2004)
 Upa! (1987)
 Valentín Trujillo (2010)
 Vanessa Miller (humor) (2003)
 Verónica Villarroel (2009)
 Viking 5 (2011)
 Villa Cariño (2011)
 Willy Sabor (2003)
 Zalo Reyes (1983)
 Zip-Zup (2012)

China 
 Chinese State Circus (varieté) (2003)

Colombia 
 Alejandra Azcárate (humor) (2018)
 Bacilos (2004, 2007)
 Carlos Sánchez (humor) (2017)
 Carlos Vives (1996, 1998, 2014, 2018)
 Charlie Zaa (1998, 1999)
 Fanny Lu (2010)
 J Balvin (2017)
 Juanes (2003, 2005, 2009)
 Maluma (2017)
 Piero (1970, 1972, 2002)
 Shakira (1997)
 Soraya (2004)
 Yandar & Yostin (2014)

Cuba 
 Celia Cruz (2000)
 Foxy (1980)
 Gente de Zona (2018)
 Jon Secada (1993)
 María Conchita Alonso (1985)
 Martika (1991)
 Miami Sound Machine (1983)
 Pitbull (2011)
Bonco Quiñongo (2019)

Denmark 
 Safri Duo (2004)

Dominican Republic 
 4:40 (1991)
 Ángela Carrasco (1981)
 Aventura (2011)
 Chichi Peralta (1999)
 Fulanito (2000)
 Johnny Ventura (1984)
 Julio Sabala (humor) (1994, 2006)
 Juan Luis Guerra (1991, 2000, 2006, 2012)
 Los Cantantes (1997)
 Los Ilegales (1998, 2003)
 Romeo Santos (2013, 2015)
 Sandy y Papo (1999)
 Wilfrido Vargas (1990, 1994)

El Salvador 
 Álvaro Torres (1991)

Spain 

 Albert Hammond (1977, 1978, 1998, 2013)
 Alejandro Jaén (1986)
 Alejandro Sanz (1994, 2001, 2011, 2016)
 Álex Ubago (2004)
 Amaral (2006)
 Ana Belén (1983, 1997)
 Ana Cirré (1997)
 Ana Torroja (2001, 2007, 2016)
 Andy & Lucas (2006)
 Barrabás (1977)
 Bertín Osborne (1990)
 Bravo (1985)
 Camilo Sesto (1974, 1981, 2004)
 Chicho Gordillo (1968, 1970, 1976)
 Christina y Los Subterráneos (1994)
 David Bisbal (2003, 2005, 2019)
 David DeMaría (2006)
 Dúo Dinámico (1966, 1969)
 Dyango (1984, 1985, 1990)
 Enrique Iglesias (1999, 2000)
 Fórmula V (1969)
 Gila (1970)
 Isabel Pantoja (2017)
 Jarabe de Palo (2004)
 Javier Estrada (2006)
 Joan Baptista Humet (1983)
 Joan Manuel Serrat (1970, 1972, 1993, 2009)
 Joaquín Cortés (2001)
 Joaquín Sabina (1993)
 José Luis Perales (1983, 1984, 1997, 2012)
 Juan Bau (1976)
 Julio Iglesias (1969, 1973, 1975, 1977, 1981)
 La Oreja de Van Gogh (2005, 2007)
 Loco Mía (1992)
 Los del Río (1997)
 Los marismeños (1979)
 Luz Casal (1993)
 Manolo Galván (1975, 1976)
 Manolo Otero (1977)
 Mari Trini (1976)
 Marta Sánchez (1998)
 Massiel (1967, 1984)
 Mecano (1992)
 Melendi (2014)
 Melody (2002)
 Miguel Bosé (1981, 1982, 1984, 1994, 1997, 2001, 2005, 2008, 2013, 2018)
 Miguel Gallardo (1985)
 Nacho Cano (1997)
 Nino Bravo (1971)
 Olé Olé (1989)
 Pablo Alborán (2013, 2016, 2020)
 Pablo Abraira (1978, 1995)
 Paloma San Basilio (1979, 1983, 1986, 2014)
 Pecos (1982)
 Plácido Domingo (1994)
 Raphael (1982, 1987, 2005, 2010, 2014, 2019)
 Rocío Jurado (1980)
 Rosana (1999, 2012)
 Rosario (2003)
 Sarah Sanders (1998)
 Sergio Dalma (1992, 1993, 2002)
 Sergio y Estíbaliz (1977)
 Tony Ronald (1973)
 Trigo Limpio (1977)
 Víctor Manuel (1983, 1997)

United States 

 Aventura (2011)
 Bacilos (2004, 2007)
 Backstreet Boys (1998, 2019)
Becky G (2019)
 Big Mountain (1995)
 CNCO (2018)
 Cheap Trick (1990)
 Connie Stevens (1980)
 Creedence Clearwater Revisited (1999)
 David Hasselhoff (2001)
 Donna Summer (1994)
 Earth, Wind & Fire (2008)
 Eddie Money (1987)
 Faith No More (1991)
 Foxy (1980)
 Fulanito (2000)
 Gloria Gaynor (1980)
 Huey Lewis and the News (1994)
Ha*Ash (2018)
 Joey Travolta (1980)
 John Denver (1985)
 Jonas Brothers (2013)
 Journey (2008)
 Kansas (2006)
 KC and The Sunshine Band (1981, 2009)
 Kool & The Gang (2003)
 Laura Branigan (1986, 1988, 1996)
 Lionel Richie (2016)
 Manoella Torres (1987)
 Marc Anthony (2009, 2012, 2019)
Maroon 5 (2020)
 Martika (1991)
 Maureen McGovern (1981)
 Miami Sound Machine (1983)
 Mr. Mister (1988)
 Neil Sedaka (1980)
 Nicky Jam (2016)
 No Mercy (1997)
 Peabo Bryson (2001)
 Peter Cetera (2018)
 Peter Yarrow (1972)
 Pitbull (2011)
 Prince Royce (2012, 2018)
 Ray Conniff (1979, 1981)
 Richard Marx (1992)
 REO Speedwagon (1989)
 Romeo Santos (2013, 2015)
 Romina Power (1977)
 Santa Esmeralda (1979)
 Scott y Muriel (varieté) (2007)
 Sheila E. (1986)
 Soraya (2004)
 Tavares (1979, 1987)
 The Hues Corporation (1978)
 The Stylistics (1980)
 Toto (2004)
 Vivian Reed (1988)
 Willie Colón (1994)

France 
 Emma Shapplin (1999)
 Francis Lalanne (1991)
 Kassav' (1993)
 Luis Mariano (1991)
 Natusha (1993)
 Pascale Petit (1978)
 Paul Mauriat (1980)
 Romuald (1969)
 Vaitiare (1993)
 Valerio (1983)

Guatemala 
 Ricardo Arjona (1995, 1999, 2001, 2004, 2010, 2015)

Honduras 
 Banda Blanca (1992)
 Polache (2014, folk contest)

Ireland 
 Des Smyth (1976)

Israel 
 Mayumana (2007)

Italy 
 Al Bano (1977)
 Ambra Angliolini (1997)
 Annalisa Minetti (1999)
 Benito di Paula (1979)
 Claudio Baglioni (1994)
 Daniel Sentacruz Ensemble (1978)
 Ennio Sangiusto (1966, 1967, 1991)
 Eros Ramazzotti (1998, 2016)
 Franco Simone (1979, 1982, 2003)
 Gino Renni (1973)
 Iva Zanicchi (1978)
 Jovanotti (1995)
 Laura Pausini (1997, 2014)
 Loredana Perasso (1988)
 Lucio Dalla (1995)
 Matia Bazar (1979)
 Miguel Bosé (1981, 1982, 1984, 1994, 1997, 2001, 2005, 2008, 2013)
 Nicola di Bari (1971)
 Ombretta Colli (1978)
 Paolo Meneguzzi (1997, 1998, 2009)
 Paolo Salvatore (1970)
 Piero (1970, 1972, 2002)
 Raffaella Carrá (1982)
 Ricardo Cocciante (1979, 1994)
 Ricos y Pobres (1984)
 Romina Power (1977)
 Salvatore Adamo (1982, 2004, 2012)
 Umberto Tozzi (1980, 2004)

Jamaica 
 Inner Circle (1995)
 Jimmy Cliff (1969)

Japan 
 Teal Joy (1960)

Mexico 

 Alejandra Guzmán (1995)
 Alejandro Fernández (2001, 2006)
 Ana Gabriel (1992, 1995, 2014, 2020)
 Anahí (2010)
 Annatell (2003)
 Armando Manzanero (1968, 1991)
 Café Tacvba (1996, 2005)
 Camila (2009, 2012, 2017)
 Carlos Santana (2009)
 Cristian Castro (2000, 2002, 2004)
 Daniela Romo (1984)
 Dulce (1985)
 Edith Márquez (2001)
 Eduardo Palomo (1995)
 Emmanuel (1983, 1989, 1992, 1994, 2000)
 Enrique Guzmán (1963)
 Fernando Allende (1992)
 Flavio César (1997)
 Fey (1996, 2005)
 Garibaldi (1993)
 Gilberto Gless (Humor) (1997)
 Gloria Trevi (1993, 2013)
 Jesse & Joy (2014, 2018)
 Juan Gabriel (1996, 1997, 1998, 2002, 2004)
 Julieta Venegas (2005)
 Los Flamingos Mexicanos (1966)
 Los Temerarios (1993)
 Los Tigres del Norte (2006)
 Lucero (1992, 1994, 2001)
 Lucía Méndez (1983)
 Luis Miguel (1985, 1986, 1990, 1994, 2012)
 Lynda Thomas (2001)
 Magneto (1992)
 Maná (1994, 1996, 2003, 2013)
 Manuel Mijares (1990)
 Marco Antonio Solís (1998, 2005, 2008, 2011, 2016, 2019)
 Marisela (1990)
 Molotov (2004)
 Noel Schajris (2011)
 Onda Vaselina (1994)
 Pandora (1987)
 Patricia Manterola (1995, 1996, 2002)
 Paulina Rubio (1994, 2000, 2002, 2005)
 Pedro Fernández (1998, 2001)
 Pedro Vargas (1979)
 Raúl Vale (1982)
 Reik (2010, 2015)
 Río Roma (2017)
 Ricardo Arancibia (1960, 1969)
 Sin Bandera (2006, 2017)
 Thalía (1994, 1997)
 Verónica Castro (1989)
 Yuri (1984, 1991, 1995, 2011, 2019)

Nicaragua 
 Hernaldo Zúñiga (1981, 1994, 2000)

Norway 
 a-ha (2006)
 Titanic (1984)

Netherlands 
 2 Unlimited (1996)
 Euson (1972)
 Scott y Muriel (varieté) (2007)
 Tony Ronald (1973)
 Vengaboys (2001)

Panama 
 El General (1993)
 Miguel Bosé (1981, 1982, 1984, 1994, 1997, 2001, 2005, 2008, 2013)

Paraguay 
 Gloria del Paraguay (1987)
 Perla (1984)

Peru 
 Chabuca Granda (1965, 1978)
 Eva Ayllón (2001)

Puerto Rico 
 Yandel (2015)
 Alexis & Fido (2014)
 Calle 13 (2008, 2011)
 Carlos Ponce (1999, 2000, 2002)
 Chayanne (1988, 1991, 1998, 2000, 2002, 2008, 2011)
 Cultura Profética (2015)
 Daddy Yankee (2006, 2009, 2013)
 Don Omar (2007, 2010, 2016)
 Elvis Crespo (2000)
 José Feliciano (1984, 1985, 2006)
 Luis Fonsi (2004, 2009, 2012, 2018)
 Marc Anthony (2009, 2012, 2019)
 Manoella Torres (1987)
 Nydia Caro (1974, 1979, 1988)
 Obie Bermúdez (2005)
 Rakim y Ken-Y (2009)
 Ricky Martin (1993, 1994, 1996, 2007, 2014, 2020)
 Tito "El Bambino" (2010)
 Tommy Torres (2014)
 Wisin & Yandel (2008, 2013, 2019)
 Wisin (2016)
 Zion & Lennox (2018)
 Bad Bunny (2019)

United Kingdom 
(Includes England, Scotland, Wales and Gibraltar).
 Air Supply (1987)
 Albert Hammond (1977, 1978, 1998, 2013)
 Andy Gibb (1984)
 Bond (2001)
 Bucks Fizz (1983)
 Duran Duran (2000)
 Elton John (2013)
 Franz Ferdinand (2006)
 Jamiroquai (2018)
 Jeanette (1974)
 Morrissey (2012)
 Nazareth (1985)
 Olivia Newton-John (2017)
 Peter Frampton (2008)
 Rick Astley (2016)
 Rod Stewart (2014)
 Roger Hodgson (2009)
 Shakin' Stevens (1983)
 Sheena Easton (1984)
 Shirley Bassey (1989)
 Simply Red (2009)
 Sting (2011)
 The Orchestra (2005)
 The Police (1982)
 The Tremeloes (1970)
 Tom Jones (2007)

Russia 
 David y Danya (varieté) (2002)
 Petrosyans (varieté) (2010)

Singapore 
 Vanessa Mae (1997)

South Africa 
 Miriam Makeba (1972)

Sweden 
 Ace of Base (1996)
 A-Teens (2000)
 Dr. Alban (1993)
 Europe (1990, 2018)

Switzerland 
 D'Holmikers (2006)
 Krokus (1985)
 Paolo Meneguzzi (1997, 1998, 2009)

Tahití 
 Vaitiare (1993)

Uruguay 
 Chocolate Latino (2002)
 Juan Verdaguer (1980)
 Los Iracundos (1972, 1995)
 Márama (2017)
 Nietos del Futuro (2002)
 Natalia Oreiro (2001, 2002)
 Rombai (2017)

Venezuela 
 Carlos Baute (2011)
 Carlos Mata (1988, 1989)
 Chino & Nacho (2013)
 Enrique Guzmán (1963)
 Franco De Vita (2008)
 José Luis Rodríguez "El Puma" (1980, 1981, 1988, 1991, 1995)
 Los Fantasmas del Caribe (1994)
 Lupita Ferrer (1988)
 María Conchita Alonso (1985)
 Mirla Castellanos (1981, 1983, 1985)
 Mirtha Pérez (1969)
 Natusha (1993)
 Qué Pasa (1991)
 Ricardo Montaner (1991, 1999, 2002, 2003, 2016)

References 

Viña del Mar International Song Festival